Phase 3 is a station of the Rapid Metro Gurgaon opened in November 2013. It is owned by Haryana Mass Rapid Transport Corporation Limited (HMRTC) and operated by Delhi Metro Rail 
Corporation (DMRC). Earlier it was operated by Rapid Metro Gurgaon Limited (RMGL).

Connections

References

External links

 
 

Rapid Metro Gurgaon stations
Railway stations in Gurgaon district